The Pentatomoidea are a superfamily of insects in the Heteroptera suborder of the Hemiptera order. As Hemiptera, they share a common arrangement of sucking mouthparts. The roughly 7000 species under Pentatomoidea are divided into 21 families (16 extant and 5 extinct). Among these are the stink bugs and shield bugs, jewel bugs, giant shield bugs, and burrower bugs.

Description

The Pentatomoidea are characterised by a well-developed scutellum (the hardened extension of the thorax over the abdomen). It can be triangular to semielliptical in shape. The antennae typically have five segments. The tarsi usually have two or three segments.

Shield bugs have prothoracic glands (in their thoraces, between the first and second pair of legs) that produce a foul-smelling liquid, which is used defensively to deter potential predators and is sometimes released when the bugs are handled. These prothoracic glands are also present in the nymphs, which are similar to adults except smaller and without wings.

The nymphs and adults have distinctive piercing mouthparts, with mandibles and maxillae modified to form a piercing "stylet" sheathed within a modified labium. The stylet is used to suck sap from plants, or in some cases to suck blood from other animals.

Pentatomoidea are mostly phytophagous, although some are hematophagous. They can become significant pests, causing economic damage to certain crops.

Species that resemble pentatomoids are found in the superfamily Coreoidea.

Families
These families are classified under Pentatomoidea:

Extant
Acanthosomatidae  – known as shield bugs, contains 46 genera and 184 species found worldwide
Canopidae  – found strictly in the Neotropical realm
Cydnidae  – known as burrowing bugs, it contains 120 genera and about 765 species worldwide.
Dinidoridae  – found in tropical Asia, Africa, Australia, and South America, composed of 16 genera and about 65 species
Lestoniidae  – small, round bugs that bear a resemblance to tortoise beetles (Chrysomelidae), composed only of one genus and two species, endemic to Australia
Megarididae  – contains only one extant genus (Megaris) and 16 species, small, globular bugs occurring in Central America
Parastrachiidae  – bright red and black bugs exhibiting maternal care of eggs, it contains only two genera: Dismegistus (Africa) and Parastrachia (Eastern Asia).
Pentatomidae  – known as stink bugs, it is the largest family in Pentatomoidea. It contains around 900 genera and over 4700 species.
Phloeidae – large mottled brown and flattened bugs found strictly in the Neotropical realm. It is composed on only 2 genera and 3 species. They are known to exhibit strong maternal care.
Plataspidae – found in Asia, particularly eastern Asia, although a few species of Coptosoma occur in the Palearctic. They are round plant-feeding bugs. It has about 59 genera and 560 species. 
Saileriolidae - only recently removed from inclusion within Urostylididae.
Scutelleridae – known as jewel bugs or shield-backed bugs. Composed of 81 genera and about 450 species.
Tessaratomidae – known as giant shield bugs because they are usually relatively large. Has about 55 genera and 240 species worldwide (mainly in the Old World tropics). 
Thaumastellidae – small bugs usually found under rocks in tropical Africa and the Middle East. It contains only one genus and three species. There is some debate to their inclusion within Pentatomoidea.
Thyreocoridae  – includes the former family, subfamily Corimelaeninae  – known as ebony bugs, they are small, oval, shiny black bugs.
Urostylididae – contains about 11 genera and 170 species. They are found in Southern and Eastern Asia. (including Korea).

Extinct
†Mesopentacoridae Popov 1968 Middle Jurassic-Early Cretaceous, Asia
†Primipentatomidae – family with about four Early Cretaceous fossil species from China.
†Probascanionidae Handlirsch 1921 Monotypic, Early Jurassic, Germany
†Protocoridae Handlirsch 1906 Early-Middle Jurassic, Eurasia
†Venicoridae Yao et al. 2012 Early Cretaceous, China

Phylogeny
The morphological unweighted tree of Pentatomoidea after Grazia et al. (2008).

Gallery

See also
List of shield bug species of Korea
Pentatomomorpha
Sunn pest

References

External links

 Stink Bug Fact Sheet from the United States National Pest Management Association

 
Hemiptera superfamilies
Agricultural pest insects